Lawrence Richard Williams II (born July 3, 1963) is a former American football offensive guard who played five seasons in the National Football League (NFL) with the Cleveland Browns, New Orleans Saints and New England Patriots. He was drafted by the Cleveland Browns in the tenth round of the 1985 NFL Draft. He played college football at the University of Notre Dame and attended Mater Dei High School in Santa Ana, California. Williams was also a member of the San Diego Chargers of the NFL. He was the athletic director of the Portland Pilots from 2004 to 2011 and the Marquette Golden Eagles from 2012 to 2013.

College career
Williams played college football for the Notre Dame Fighting Irish. He earned All-American honors twice during his college career. He graduated from Notre Dame with a Bachelor of Arts degree in 1985.

Professional career
Williams was selected by the Cleveland Browns with the 259th pick in the 1985 NFL Draft. He played in 42 games, starting 33, for the Browns from 1986 to 1988. He became a free agent in February 1989 when he was left unprotected by the Browns because of a shoulder surgery in January 1989. Williams signed with the San Diego Chargers on March 7, 1989. He was placed on the physically unable to perform list on August 29, 1989. He was released by the Chargers on September 3, 1990. Williams played in six games, starting two, for the New Orleans Saints during the 1991 season. He played in thirteen games, starting nine, for the New England Patriots in 1992. He retired in 1993 while still a member of the Patriots.

Administrative career
Williams became athletic director of the Portland Pilots of the University of Portland in June 2004 and served in that capacity till becoming Marquette's athletic director. He was named the Marquette Golden Eagles' new athletic director on December 5, 2011 and started his tenure on January 2, 2012. He left Marquette in December 2013 to pursue other interests.

Personal life
Williams' wife Laura Lee is a former collegiate All-American and national champion tennis player at Notre Dame. They have five children. Their daughter Kristin was a rower at Santa Clara University while their sons Sean, Scott and Eric played football at Yale University. Larry earned a J.D. degree from the University of San Diego School of Law in 1992. He practiced law for six years for Baker & Daniels, an Indianapolis-based firm, after his football career. He then returned to Notre Dame to work on licensing and product marketing for the athletic department from 1999 to 2003.

References

External links
 Just Sports Stats

Living people
1963 births
American football offensive guards
Notre Dame Fighting Irish football players
Cleveland Browns players
San Diego Chargers players
New Orleans Saints players
New England Patriots players
Marquette Golden Eagles athletic directors
Portland Pilots athletic directors
University of San Diego School of Law alumni
Indiana lawyers
University of Notre Dame faculty
Sportspeople from Orange, California
Players of American football from California